RBD was a Mexican Latin pop group that gained popularity from Televisa's telenovela Rebelde. In 2004, they released their first studio album, Rebelde, which received five nominations for the Billboard Latin Music Awards and won two. The album was also nominated for Premios Juventud in four categories, winning in three and for Premios Oye! into two categories, winning both. They received the award for best musical theme for "Rebelde" at the TVyNovelas Awards.

The album Nuestro Amor (2005) received a nomination for the Latin Grammy Award, Billboard Latin Music Awards and the Lo Nuestro Awards, winning in the latter. In addition to four nominations for the Premios Juventud, winning in three. The Celestial album (2006) received the Billboard Latin Music Awards from Latin Pop Album, Duo or Group.

The song "No Pares" won the Orgullosamente Latino Award for Latin Song of the Year, defeating "Ser o Parecer" also of the group. The group received its second Latin Grammy nomination for the album Empezar Desde Cero (2007), losing again.

Awards and nominations

Notes

References

Awards
Lists of awards received by Mexican musician
Lists of awards received by musical group